Elayne Viola Jones (January 30, 1928 – December 17, 2022) was an American timpanist. An African American woman, she broke the color barrier in classical music by becoming the first Black principal in a major American orchestra in 1972. In 2019 she became the fourth female member of the Percussive Arts Society Hall of Fame.

Early life 
Elayne Viola Jones was born in New York City on January 30, 1928, the only child of immigrants Cecil and Ometa Jones from Barbados. She began learning piano at the age of six from her mother who had originally come to New York with the promise of a career as a concert pianist, but ended up as a cleaner due to her color. With this, she became her daughter's first piano teacher and motivated her with words such as "Laynie, you’re going to do something respectable. You’re not going to clean White people’s floors!" With time, she joined the choir at St. Luke’s Episcopal Church where she preferred to  sing harmony and was soon exposed to the music of Duke Ellington, Count Basie, and Frank Sinatra.

Education 
Jones attended an all-girls junior high school in Harlem and due to her piano skills, she was accepted into Music and Art High School, an elite school that was attended by students from all the five boroughs of New York. In the musical school, all piano students were expected to also practice an orchestra instrument. Jones fell in love with violin there, but her teacher Isadore Russ told her she was too skinny, instead handing her a pair of drumsticks, based on the notion that "Negroes have rhythm". Therefore, she combined piano, timpani and singing together in high school.

In June 1945, Jones graduated from the High School of Music & Art (now the Fiorello H. LaGuardia High School of Music & Art and Performing Arts). Sponsored by Duke Ellington, she was awarded a scholarship to the Juilliard School of Music. At Juilliard she became one of the protégés of the New York Philharmonic timpanist, Saul Goodman. She also benefited from Morris “Moe” Goldenberg who was inducted into PAS hall of fame two years after Goodman. In 1948, she obtained her diploma in timpani and in 1949 she obtained her postgraduate diploma in percussion under the tutelage of Saul Goodman.

Career 
At the early part of her career, she was faced with  racism and gender discrimination. Jones auditioned with the New York City Opera but they were reluctant to employ her due to her skin color and gender. However, her teacher, Goodman stepped in to remind them of her extraordinary performance abilities. She became the first Black person to play in an opera orchestra in 1949 and she worked with that orchestra for eleven years. She later joined the orchestra of the San Francisco Opera, and as a freelancer performed for New York Metropolitan shows such as Carousel, South Pacific, and Green Willow. In 1958 she had the opportunity to perform with the New York Philharmonic and in 1960 she left the New York City Opera to become part of the newly created American Symphony Orchestra led by Leopold Stokowski. In 1972 she won a blind audition for the San Francisco Symphony under the supervision of Seiji Ozawa which made her the only African American to attain such a position at that time. She became popular in San Francisco, with many critics confirming her extraordinary performance capabilities. Heuwell Tircuit attested in The San Francisco Chronicle after her debut that  Arthur Bloomfield of The San Francisco Examiner reported that her work at the San Francisco Opera was perfect and suave that he was about to fall out of his seat. Also, Jones took teaching positions at several schools in New York City, including the Metropolitan Music School, Bronx Community College, and the Westchester Conservatory of Music. In her career, she presented more than 300 lone lecture demonstrations of percussion instruments in schools and colleges.

Racism and gender discrimination 
Jones suffered racial and gender segregation  in her career. She chose a path that is majorly for men and the white people. She had to prove that music could be played by anyone who loves it, irrespective of gender and colour. Her greatest contributions have been the changes she made to the narrative. She confirmed that she suffered racial abuse then gender discrimination.  In 1950 during the tour by New York City Opera, Jones and her colleague Blanche Birdsong went to the Chicago Opera House for early preparation for the concert but the doorman refused to let her in with the expression  Also, at the beginning part of her career, she was forced to sleep in accomodations meant for African American while her colleagues slept in luxurious hotel.

Activisms 
In 1965, Jones, other Black musicians, and Benjamin Steinberg (conductor) founded the Symphony of the New World. It is the first racially integrated orchestra in the United States that give black musicians the opportunity to play orchestral repertoire. Also, they introduced blind auditions to eliminate racial prejudice. The San Francisco Symphony accepted the advice and in 1972 Jones blindly beat forty people to land herself a job at the company. The blind audition is a tradition that is used up till today.

Tenure controversy 
In 1974 a seven-man committee voted against her and  Ryohei Nakagawa. Jones sued the Orchestra and musician's union on the bases of racial and gender discrimination. However, she was allowed to play for another year but she was fired when the court ordered another supervised vote in August 1975 and she was also turned down. She continued to perform tenure with San Francisco Opera till 1998 but her case with San Francisco Symphony remains a controversy.

Personal life and death 
Jones met George Kaufman at Adirondacks when she was playing a drum set at a jazz gig in 1952. They remained married for over ten years. At the time of their divorce in 1964, they had three children Stephen, Harriett, and Cheryl.

Jones died from the effects of dementia on December 17, 2022, at the age of 94.

References 

1928 births
2022 deaths
Percussionists
Timpanists
American people of Barbadian descent
Musicians from New York City